The Brazil national roller hockey team is the national team side of Brazil at international roller hockey. Usually is part of FIRS Roller Hockey World Cup and CSP Copa America.

Brazil squad - 2010 Rink Hockey American Championship
The team was the 2010 Rink Hockey American Champions.

Team Staff
 General Manager:
 Mechanic:

Coaching Staff
 Head Coach: Gerard Pujol
 Assistant:

Titles
Roller Hockey Pan American Games-1983 (1)

References

External links
Brazil Roller Sports Federation

National Roller Hockey Team
Roller hockey
National roller hockey (quad) teams